Milton Louis Carter, also known as M. L. Carter (born December 9, 1955) is a former American football cornerback who played three seasons for the Kansas City Chiefs of the National Football League (NFL). He also played in the Canadian Football League (CFL) and in the United States Football League (USFL). His career ended due to knee injuries.

Early life and education
M. L. Carter was born on December 9, 1955 in Beaufort, South Carolina. He attended Monterey High School.  He went to college at Cal State-Fullerton and at San Jose State.

Professional career
Kansas City Chiefs
Carter first played for the Kansas City Chiefs. In week 11, 1979, he had his first career interception; a 20-yard return.  The next week he had two interceptions for 13 yards.  He played in all 16 games in 1979.  He played in seven games in 1980 and 10 in 1981.

Hamilton Tiger-Cats
In 1982, he played one game for the Hamilton Tiger-Cats of the Canadian Football League.

Boston Breakers
The next year, he played in 18 games for the Boston Breakers of the USFL. He had one interception.

References

1955 births
Living people
American football cornerbacks
Kansas City Chiefs players
Hamilton Tiger-Cats players
Canadian football defensive backs
Cal State Fullerton Titans football players
San Jose State Spartans football players
Players of American football from South Carolina
Sportspeople from Beaufort, South Carolina